Gerrards Cross is a town and civil parish in south Buckinghamshire, England, separated from the London Borough of Hillingdon at Harefield by Denham, south of Chalfont St Peter and north bordering villages of Fulmer, Hedgerley, Iver Heath and Stoke Poges. It spans foothills of the Chiltern Hills and land on the right bank of the River Misbourne. Bulstrode Park Camp was an Iron Age fortified encampment.

The town has a railway station on the Chiltern Main Line with regular services to London. Fast train takes 19 minutes to Marylebone. The town is close to M25 motorway and the M40 motorway runs beside woodland on its southern boundary.

In 2014, a major national surveying company named Gerrards Cross as the most sought-after and expensive commuter town or village in their London Hot 100 report, with an average sale price of £1,000,000.

History
The town name is new compared with the great bulk of English towns. Gerrards Cross did not exist in any formal sense until 1859, when it was formed by taking pieces out of the three parishes of Chalfont St Peter, Fulmer, Stoke Poges and Upton cum Chalvey to form a new ecclesiastical parish. It is named after the Gerrard family who in the early 17th century owned a manor here. At that time, homes which were not farms, were smallholdings clustered in a hamlet in the south of an elongated parish of Chalfont St Peter. Near its centre is the site of an Iron Age minor hillfort, Bulstrode Park Camp, which is a scheduled ancient monument. Originally named Jarrett's Cross, before the times of the Gerrard family, after a highwayman,  some areas retain the original name, such as Jarrett's Hill leading up to WEC International off the A40 west of the town.

On 1 January 2016, Gerrards Cross officially became a town with the parish council becoming a town council.

Facilities

The large and distinctive parish church is dedicated to St. James. It was built in 1861 as a memorial to Colonel George Alexander Reid who was MP for Windsor, and designed by Sir William Tite in yellow brick with a Byzantine-style dome, Chinese-looking turrets and an Italianate Campanile. In 1969 the singer Lulu married Maurice Gibb of the Bee Gees in the church. The actress Margaret Rutherford is buried with her husband Stringer Davis in the St James Church graveyard.

The town has its own library and its own cinema, the Everyman Gerrards Cross, which originally opened in 1925.

Independent schools include St Mary's (all girls- through to sixth form). Students of secondary school age attend either one of the local grammar schools, such as Dr Challoner's Grammar School (Boys with co-educational Sixth Form), Dr Challoner's High School (Girls), The Royal Grammar School, High Wycombe (Boys), John Hampden Grammar School (Boys), and Beaconsfield High School (Girls) Chesham Grammar School (Co-ed), and the local Upper School, Chalfonts Community College, which is the catchment school.

On the south side of the town is the Gerrards Cross Memorial Building, on the site of the former vicarage. The building was designed by Sir Edwin Lutyens and unveiled in 1922 to commemorate the town's losses during the First World War. It is the only example of a Lutyens war memorial designed with a functional purpose.

Transport
 
The town has a railway station on the Chiltern Main Line which opened on 2 April 1906. This provides services to London and Birmingham with a commuting time of 18 minutes on the fast train to London Marylebone. A new arch over the section of deep railway cutting to allow Tesco to build a supermarket collapsed on 30 June 2005 at 19:30. Nobody was injured but the line was closed for over six weeks. Compensation by Tesco to Chiltern was reported as £8.5m and the retailer compensated by funding a media campaign to reinstate business immediately lost by the closure. Construction of a correctly constructed arch began in January 2009.

The 11.36am from London Paddington to Gerrards Cross was an official or 'parliamentary train' recognised as an outlandish loss-making service to prevent the link to that terminus being closed or re-allocated. This train now terminates at West Ruislip. In 2011, National Rail was lobbied to phase the service out.

Demographics
In the 2021 Census, the largest religious affiliations in Gerrards Cross were Christian (46.2%), those with no religion (22.4%), Sikh (10.5%), Hindu (7.5%), Muslim (6.4%), Jewish (0.8%), Buddhist (0.5%) and Other (0.5%).

It was reported 65.5% of people living in Gerrards Cross were reported as White (65.5%), Asian (25.5%), Mixed (4.0%), Black (4.0%) and Other (1.1%).

Recent history
Many houses built during development in the 1950s had defective tiles, leading to the highest court reported judgment Young & Marten Ltd v McManus Childs Ltd, holding that a person who contracts to do work and supply materials implicitly warrants that the materials will be fit for purpose, even if the purchaser specifies the materials to be used.

Popular culture
 
Stanley Kubrick filmed some of the exteriors in his feature 1962 film Lolita, notably Charlotte Haze's house, in Gerrards Cross.

"The Italian Lesson" sketch in the first episode of the first series of the BBC Television comedy show Monty Python's Flying Circus (first broadcast in 1969) includes the line "'Sono inglese di Gerrard's (sic) Cross', I am an Englishman from Gerrard's Cross."

Wombling Free (1977 film) about the Wombles was filmed in various locations in Gerrards Cross and nearby Black Park and Pinewood Studios in Iver

Jethro Tull's song "Journeyman" on their 1978 album Heavy Horses includes the line "Too late to stop for tea at Gerrards Cross".

Indie band the Hit Parade released their 3rd single "The Sun Shines in Gerrards Cross" in 1986.

St Hubert's House, a Grade II listed house to the southeast of Gerrards Cross, has been used as a filming location for TV series including Inspector Morse and The Professionals, and was the location of Colonel Hyde's house in The League of Gentlemen.

In New Tricks, the popular BBC crime drama, the opening shots of the large house in Season 12 Episode 8 "Lottery Curse" were filmed on the private road of Camp Road in Gerrard's Cross.

Notable people
Matt Aitken, song writer, record producer and musician from Stock Aitken Waterman lived in Gerrards Cross. 
Roy Castle, dancer, singer, comedian, actor, television presenter and musician, lived in Gerrards Cross.
Amal Clooney, barrister and human rights activist, moved from Lebanon to Gerrards Cross with her family at the age of 2.
Angela Douglas, actress, born in Gerrards Cross 29 October 1940.
Kenneth More, actor, born in Gerrards Cross 20 September 1914.
Dominic Raab, politician, Conservative Member of Parliament for Esher and Walton, current Deputy Prime Minister, Secretary of State for Justice and Lord Chancellor and former Foreign Secretary, grew up in Gerrards Cross.
Joan G. Robinson, author and illustrator, lived in Gerrards Cross. Her best-known book is When Marnie Was There, which was adapted into an animated film by Studio Ghibli.
Peter Stringfellow, businessman and nightclub owner, lived in Gerrards Cross (died 7 June 2018).

References
A History of Chalfont St Peter and Gerrards Cross C G Edmonds 1964 and The History of Bulstrode by A M Baker 2003 published as one book by Colin Smythe Ltd. 2003

External links

 Gerrards Cross Library

 
Towns in Buckinghamshire
Civil parishes in Buckinghamshire
South Bucks District
Hill forts in Buckinghamshire